The Nisqually Indian Tribe of the Nisqually Reservation is a federally recognized tribe of Nisqually people. They are a Coast Salish people of indigenous peoples of the Pacific Northwest. Their tribe is located in Washington.

Some of the people of Nisqually descent are enrolled in the Confederated Tribes of the Chehalis Reservation but neither tribe allows a Nisqually to be enrolled in both tribes at the same time.

Reservation
The Nisqually Reservation is 1,000-acres large and located in Thurston County, Washington, 15 miles east of Olympia. All of the current reservation land was acquired by the tribe in the last 25 years. The reservation was  established by the Treaty of Medicine Creek of 1854. Originally 5,105 acres, the reservation was mostly east of the Nisqually River in Pierce County, Washington. The tribal lands were broken into individual allotments in 1884. In 1917, Pierce County, through the process of condemnation proceedings (eminent domain), took 3,370 acres (14 km²) for the Fort Lewis  Military Reserve.

Government
The Nisqually Indian Tribe is headquartered in Olympia, Washington. They ratified their constitution and bylaws on 9 September 1946. These were amended on 28 October 1994. The tribe is governed by a seven-member, democratically elected General Council. The current tribal administration is as follows:

 Chairperson: Farron McCloud
 Vice-Chairperson: William Frank III
 Secretary: Sheila McCloud
 Treasurer: Stephanie Scott
 Member:Brian McCloud
 Member: Antonette Squally
 Member: Vacant .

Language
English is commonly spoken on by the tribe. Their traditional language is the Nisqually language, which is a Southern Puget Sound Salish language.

Economic development
The Nisqually Indian Tribe owns and operates Red Wind Casino, Blue Camas Buffet, Squalli-Absch Grille, The Medicine Creek Deli, and Pealo's Landing.

Notable tribal members
 Billy Frank Jr. (b. 1931), Indigenous rights and environmentalist activist

Notes

References
 Pritzker, Barry M. A Native American Encyclopedia: History, Culture, and Peoples. Oxford: Oxford University Press, 2000. .

External links
 Nisqually Indian Tribe, official website
 Constitution and Bylaws of the Nisqually Tribe of the Nisqually Indian Reservation

Coast Salish governments
Native American tribes in Washington (state)
Federally recognized tribes in the United States
Indigenous peoples of the Pacific Northwest Coast